Three ships of the United States Navy have been named USS Jacob Jones, in honor of Jacob Jones:

, was a  destroyer, commissioned in 1919 and sunk by torpedoes in February 1942

See also

United States Navy ship names